Simson L. Garfinkel (born 1965) is a Program Scientist at AI2050, part of Schmidt Futures. He has held several roles across government, including a Senior Data Scientist at the Department of Homeland Security (DHS), the US Census Bureau's Senior Computer Scientist for Confidentiality and Data Access. and a computer scientist at the National Institute of Standards and Technology (2015-2017). Prior to that, he was an associate professor at the Naval Postgraduate School in Monterey, California (2006-2015). In addition to his research, Garfinkel is a journalist, an entrepreneur, and an inventor; his work is generally concerned with computer security, privacy, and information technology.

Research 
Garfinkel's early research was in the field of optical storage. While he was an undergraduate at the MIT Media Laboratory, Garfinkel developed CDFS, the first file system for write-once optical disk systems. During the summer of 1987, he worked at Brown University's IRIS Project, where he developed a server allowing CDROMs to be shared over a network simultaneously by multiple workstations.

In 1991, while a senior editor at NeXTWORLD magazine, Garfinkel created an address book program for the NeXT Computer called SBook. One of SBook's most popular features was a search field that performed a full-text search of all of the records in the address book with each keypress. This kind of search is now standard on many computer programs, including Apple's Mail application and Mozilla Thunderbird. SBook was one of the first programs to incorporate this kind of search technology.

In 1995, Garfinkel moved to Martha's Vineyard and started Vineyard.NET, the Vineyard's first Internet Service Provider. Vineyard.NET was bought by Broadband2Wireless, a wireless ISP, in 2000.  The company went bankrupt in September 2001, and Garfinkel bought Vineyard.NET back from the bankruptcy court.

In 1998, Garfinkel founded Sandstorm Enterprises, a computer security firm that developed advanced computer forensic tools used by businesses and governments to audit their systems. Sandstorm was acquired by Niksun in 2010. Garfinkel is the inventor of six patents, mostly in the field of computer security.

In 2003, Garfinkel and Abhi Shelat published an article in IEEE Security & Privacy magazine reporting on an experiment in which they purchased 158 used hard drives from a variety of sources and checked to see whether they still contained readable data.  Roughly one third of the drives appeared to have information that was highly confidential and should have been erased prior to the drive's resale.

In 2006, Garfinkel introduced cross-drive analysis, an unsupervised machine learning algorithm for automatically reconstructing social networks from hard drives and other kinds of data-carrying devices that are likely to contain pseudo-unique information.

In September 2006, Garfinkel joined the faculty of the Naval Postgraduate School (NPS) in Monterey, California, as an associate professor of Computer Science. He moved to Arlington, Virginia, in June 2010 to help NPS with its research aims in the National Capital Region. He transitioned to the National Institute of Standards and Technology in January 2015, and to the US Census Bureau in 2017.

A common theme throughout Garfinkel's research is introduction of the scientific method to digital forensics.

Education and honors 
Garfinkel obtained three BS degrees from MIT in 1987; a MS in journalism from Columbia University in 1988; and a PhD in computer science from MIT in 2005.  He was a postdoctoral fellow at the Center for Research on Computation and Society at Harvard University from September 2005 through August 2008. He was named a Fellow of the ACM in 2012, and a fellow of the Institute of Electrical and Electronics Engineers in 2019.

Publications 
Garfinkel is the author or co-author of 16 books, and the author of more than a thousand articles.  He is a contributing writer for Technology Review and has written as a freelancer for many publications including Wired magazine, The Boston Globe, Privacy Journal, and CSO Magazine. His work for CSO Magazine earned him five regional and national journalism awards, including the Jesse H. Neal Business Journalism Awards in 2003 and 2004.

Garfinkel is also the editor of The Forensics Wiki

Books 
 The Computer Book: From the Abacus to Artificial Intelligence, 250 Milestones in the History of Computer Science (Sterling Milestones), by Simson L. Garfinkel and Rachel H. Grunspan. 2018 (Sterling)
 Usable Security: History, Themes, and Challenges], by Simson Garfinkel and Heather Lipford, 2014. (Morgan & Claypool, part of the Synthesis Lectures on Information Security, Privacy and Trust series.)
 
 
 
 
 Web Security, Privacy and Commerce, with Gene Spafford. 2001. (O'Reilly & Associates, Inc.)
  (review by Peter G. Neumann and review by Eugene Spafford, in the RISKS Digest)
 
  (review by Rob Slade in the RISKS Digest)
 
  (review by Peter G. Neumann in the RISKS Digest)

References

External links
 Simson Garfinkel's home page
 Simson Garfinkel's official website at the Naval Postgraduate School

1965 births
American computer scientists
American male journalists
American technology writers
Columbia University Graduate School of Journalism alumni
Fellows of the Association for Computing Machinery
Living people
Massachusetts Institute of Technology alumni
Naval Postgraduate School faculty
People from Arlington County, Virginia
Place of birth missing (living people)
Wired (magazine) people
Journalists from Virginia
Scientists from Virginia